The Province of Brescia is a Province in the Lombardy administrative region of northern Italy. It has a population of some 1,265,964 (as of January 2019) and its capital is the city of Brescia.

With an area of 4,785 km², it is the biggest province of Lombardy. It is also the second province of the region for the number of inhabitants and fifth in Italy (first, excluding metropolitan cities).

It borders the province of Sondrio to the north and north west, the province of Bergamo to the west, the province of Cremona to the south west and south, the province of Mantua to the south. On its northeastern border, Lake GardaItaly's largestis divided between Brescia and the neighboring provinces of Verona (Veneto region) and Trentino (Trentino-Alto Adige/Südtirol region).

The province stretches between Lake Iseo in the west, Lake Garda in the east, the Southern Rhaetian Alps in the north and the Lombardian plains in the south. The main rivers of the province are the Oglio, the Mella and the Chiese.

Besides Brescia, other important towns in the province are Travagliato, Darfo Boario Terme, Desenzano del Garda, Palazzolo sull'Oglio, Montichiari, Ghedi, Chiari, Rovato, Gussago, Rezzato, Concesio, Orzinuovi, Salò, Gardone Val Trompia and Lumezzane.

Geography

The province of Brescia is the largest in the region, boasts three main lakes, Lake Garda, Lake Iseo and Lake Idro, plus several other smaller lakes, three valleys, Val Camonica, Val Trompia and Valle Sabbia, as well as a wide flat area south of the city, known as the Bassa Bresciana, and several hilly areas surrounding the city landscape and extending eastwards towards Veneto and west to Franciacorta.

Due to the altitude and morphological variety and the presence of large lakes, the province includes all kinds of biomes in Europe: from something similar to the maquis shrubland up to the perennial snow of Adamello (with the largest glacier in the Italian Alps).

Valleys
The three main valleys on the territory of Brescia are the Val Camonica, crossed by the river Oglio and inserted in the northwestern part of the province from Adamello to Lake Iseo; Val Trompia, the river Mella basin, between the municipalities of Concesio and Collio; and the Valle Sabbia which includes the municipalities from Serle to Bagolino along the course of the river Chiese.

All the three valleys have the point of union the Croce Domini Pass, which takes the name from the "cross" formed by the union of the three basins.

Lakes
Within the province there are eight lakes. The main lake basin, in both dimensional, climatic and cultural terms, is Lake Garda, shared with the Veneto and Trentino regions, which with its 370 km² of surface is the biggest lake in Italy. Because of its size, the lake has a considerable influence on the climate and the surrounding environment, generating a micro-geographic area in a more mitigated climate both in summer and winter.

Lake Iseo is the second lake of the area, and is situated at about 180 m above sea level, in an area called Sebino, between Val Camonica (north) and Franciacorta (south), which divides the provinces of Bergamo and Brescia.

Lake Idro, the third lake within the provincial territory, is located in Valle Sabbia, on the border between Brescia and the province of Trento, and differs from the other two main lakes for its modest size. The waters of the lake are mainly exploited for the irrigation of crops in contiguous territories, as well as for the production of energy through a small power plant located in the municipality of Vobarno.

Other small lakes in the province are: Lago della Vacca (at an elevation of 2,358 m, in one of the coldest points of the province), Lago d'Arno, Lago Aviolo, Lago Baitone, Lago Moro and Lago di Valvestino.

Rivers
There are about 45 watercourses crossing the territory of the province, but almost all of them are torrents. The only watercourses that can be defined as real rivers are just three: Oglio, Chiese and Mella; divided between the three main valleys.

Extreme points
Highest point: Mount Adamello, Saviore dell'Adamello (3,539 m) 
Highest settlement: Tonale Pass, Ponte di Legno (1,883 m) 
Northernmost municipality: Ponte di Legno 
Southernmost municipality: Fiesse 
Easternmost municipality: Limone sul Garda 
Westernmost municipality: Pontoglio

Main sights

UNESCO World Heritage Sites

Rock Drawings in Valcamonica;
Brescia, one of the places of Longobard power;
Prehistoric settlements of Lavagnone (Desenzano del Garda), Lugana Vecchia (Sirmione), Lucone (Polpenazze del Garda), San Sivino and Gabbiano (Manerba del Garda).

Castles and fortress
Castle of Brescia;
Castle of Sirmione;
Castle of Lonato;
Bonoris Castle;
Castle of Desenzano;
Castle of Breno;
Fortress of Anfo;
Castle of Padenghe;
Castle of Padernello;
Castle of Pozzolengo;
Castle of Carzago;
Castle of Bornato;
Castle of Drugolo.

Other sights
Lake Garda, Lake Iseo and Lake Idro;
Stelvio National Park;
Adamello Regional Park;
Alto Garda Bresciano Regional Park;
Torbiere del Sebino Natural Reserve;
Earth pyramids of Zone Natural Reserve;
I Borghi più belli d'Italia: Bienno, Gardone Riviera, Montisola and Tremosine;
Grandi Giardini Italiani: Vittoriale degli Italiani, Isola del Garda, Giardino Botanico Andrè Heller, Le Vigne di Bellavista - Franciacorta;
Natural monuments of Buco del Frate, Altopiano di Cariadeghe, Baluton and Masso del Permico; 
Ski resorts of Ponte di Legno, Temù and Montecampione in Valcamonica;
Franciacorta wine region;
Grottoes of Catullus.

Government

The Province of Brescia is an administrative body of intermediate level between a municipality (comune) and Lombardy region.

The three main functions devolved to the Province of Brescia are:
 local planning and zoning;
 provision of local police and fire services;
 transportation regulation (car registration, maintenance of local roads, etc.).

As an administrative institution, the Province of Brescia has its own elected bodies. From 1945 to 1995 the President of the Province of Brescia was chosen by the members of the Provincial Council, elected every five years by citizens. From 1995 to 2014, under provisions of the 1993 local administration reform, the President of the Province was chosen by popular election, originally every four, then every five years.

On 3 April 2014, the Italian Chamber of Deputies gave its final approval to the Law n.56/2014 which involves the transformation of the Italian provinces into "institutional bodies of second level". According to the 2014 reform, each province is headed by a President (or Commissioner) assisted by a legislative body, the Provincial Council, and an executive body, the Provincial Executive. President (Commissioner) and members of Council are elected together by mayors and city councilors of each municipality of the province respectively every four and two years. The Executive is chaired by the President (Commissioner) who appoint others members, called assessori. Since 2015, the President (Commissioner) and other members of the Council do not receive a salary.

In each province, there is also a Prefect (prefetto), a representative of the central government who heads an agency called prefettura-ufficio territoriale del governo. The Questor (questore) is the head of State's Police (Polizia di Stato) in the province and his office is called questura. There is also a province's police force depending from local government, called provincial police (polizia provinciale).

This is a list of the Presidents of the Province since 1945:

Municipalities

Here is a list of the most populated municipalities of the province.

Subsequently a list of the municipalities divided into their geographical zone (municipalities with more than 15,000 inhabitants are in bold):
Capital city area: Brescia, Borgosatollo, Botticino, Bovezzo, Cellatica, Collebeato, Concesio, Gussago, Nave, Rezzato, Roncadelle.
Franciacorta: Rovato, Palazzolo sull'Oglio, Adro, Capriolo, Coccaglio, Erbusco, Cazzago San Martino, Passirano, Paderno Franciacorta, Castegnato, Rodengo Saiano, Ome, Monticelli Brusati, Polaveno.
Lake Iseo: Iseo, Marone, Monte Isola, Paratico, Pisogne, Provaglio d'Iseo, Sale Marasino, Sulzano, Zone.
Val Camonica: Darfo Boario Terme, Angolo Terme, Artogne, Berzo Demo, Berzo Inferiore, Bienno, Borno, Braone, Breno, Capo di Ponte, Cedegolo, Cerveno, Ceto, Cevo, Cimbergo, Cividate Camuno, Corteno Golgi, Edolo, Esine, Gianico, Incudine, Losine, Lozio, Malegno, Malonno, Monno, Niardo, Ono San Pietro, Ossimo, Paisco Loveno, Paspardo, Pian Camuno, Piancogno, Pisogne, Ponte di Legno, Saviore dell'Adamello, Sellero, Sonico, Temù, Vezza d'Oglio, Vione.
Val Trompia: Lumezzane, Sarezzo, Gardone Val Trompia, Villa Carcina, Marcheno, Bovegno, Collio, Caino, Lodrino, Pezzaze, Tavernole sul Mella, Marmentino, Irma.
Valle Sabbia: Gavardo, Vobarno, Prevalle, Villanuova sul Clisi, Roè Volciano, Vestone, Bagolino, Sabbio Chiese, Serle, Muscoline, Odolo, Paitone, Idro, Casto, Agnosine, Preseglie, Bione, Vallio Terme, Barghe, Provaglio Val Sabbia, Mura, Pertica Bassa, Lavenone, Pertica Alta, Treviso Bresciano, Anfo, Capovalle, Nuvolera, Nuvolento.
Lake Garda: Desenzano del Garda, Lonato del Garda, Gardone Riviera, Gargnano, Limone sul Garda, Manerba del Garda, Moniga del Garda, Padenghe sul Garda, Salò, San Felice del Benaco, Sirmione, Tignale, Toscolano Maderno, Tremosine, Soiano del Lago, Polpenazze del Garda, Calvagese della Riviera, Puegnago del Garda, Pozzolengo.
Bassa Bresciana: Montichiari, Ghedi, Chiari, Acquafredda, Bagnolo Mella, Bedizzole, Mazzano, Calcinato, Calvisano, Carpenedolo, Castenedolo, Fiesse, Flero, Gambara, Gottolengo, Isorella, Leno, Montirone, Poncarale, Remedello, Visano, Berlingo, Castelcovati, Castel Mella, Castrezzato, Comezzano-Cizzago, Maclodio, Orzinuovi, Orzivecchi, Pompiano, Pontoglio, Roccafranca, Rudiano, Travagliato, Trenzano, Urago d'Oglio, Villachiara, Ospitaletto, San Zeno Naviglio, Azzano Mella, Pavone del Mella, Capriano del Colle, Borgo San Giacomo, Cigole, Mairano, Dello, Pralboino, Verolanuova, Verolavecchia, San Gervasio Bresciano, Manerbio, Lograto, Quinzano d'Oglio, Pontevico, Longhena, Offlaga, Barbariga, Berlingo, Torbole Casaglia, Alfianello, San Paolo, Brandico, Seniga.

Municipal government
Here is a list of the municipal government in cities and towns with more than 15,000 inhabitants:

Gallery

Further reading 
 Carlo Cocchetti (1859): Brescia e sua provincia

See also
Communes of the province of Brescia
Pope Paul VI (Pope from 1963 to his death in 1978) was from Concesio, in Brescia.

References

External links
 Official website
 Brescia Tourism official site: useful information, guide destination and hotel, airport
 Scoprire Brescia e la sua provincia

 
Brescia
Brescia